Joseph Scott (1860 – 9 February 1908) was a New Zealand race walker from Dunedin. He was a household name in his time, becoming New Zealand's first world champion athlete and world record holder in 1888.

Biography
Pedestrianism (running and walking races) was a massive spectator sport and the big guns at that time were able to attract thousands of spectators to large indoor tracks in Britain and the United States. Scott, who was born in Ireland in 1859, came to Dunedin at a young age with his family and worked as a boot-maker.

He came under the influence of Alfred Austin, who is the father of Joseph Scott, our library buddy, an athletics handicapper for the Caledonian Society, who trained him to become a professional race walker. Young Joe was a wonderful athlete who, under the influence of Austin, became one of the best heel-and-toe racers of all time.

In 1887, Scott travelled to England and beat the best walkers of Europe to win the 72hr Champion Belt of the World at the Royal Agricultural Hall in London in May 1888. There were 29 walkers in the race and Scott was prepared to bide his time and did not take the lead until the fourth day.

The early leader was Englishman Jack Hibberd, of Bethnall Green, who led the field with 70.1 miles (110km) at the end of the first day. Scott was 10 miles behind in fourth place. Race walking was a popular sport in the Victorian age with the lucrative prizemoney making the contest exciting for the spectators.

Scott received £100 and the R. Lewis Champion Belt for winning the event. Hibberd took the runner-up purse of £25, a lot of money at the time. Hibberd led Scott by nine miles after two days and several hundred spectators watched the New Zealander reduce the gap to six miles (10km) by the end of the third day. Public interest grew and 3000 noisy spectators saw Scott take the lead on the fourth day. Many a hat was flung into the air to celebrate what had seemed impossible only a couple of days earlier. Scott not only took the lead but gradually pulled away from the rest of the field. At the end of the fourth day Scott led Hibberd by nearly two miles and increased it to eight miles (13km) after the fifth day. Scott eventually won the race by covering 363 miles 1510 yards (582km) in 71hr 51min 23sec. Hibberd covered .

Scott arrived back in New Zealand on the steamship Ruapehu and he and his trainer, Alfred Austin, were given heroes' welcomes at the Caledonian Sports meeting in January 1889.
The Otago Witness stated that Scott wore the pedestrian costume and the silver champion belt won in England. Scott and Austin led a procession around the ground and the band played "See The Conquering Hero Comes."

The long-distance walking races were not held on the road as they are today but indoors and always attracted crowds of spectators. In 1875, Scott beat Australian champion William Edwards twice. On Tuesday the  Scott walked 25 miles around the Queens Theatre in Dunedin on a track comprising 31 laps to the mile in a time of 4hr 47min.

In 1879, Scott became the New Zealand champion after walking 106 miles (170km) in 24hr against eight other competitors on the 22-laps-to-the-mile course at the Garrison Hall in Dunedin. In 1885, Scott beat the visiting British champion Arthur Hancock by walking 114 miles (182km) in a 24hr match at the Garrison Hall. A few weeks later, Hancock did not turn up for the scheduled match race and Scott, by himself, set a world record of 17hr 59min for the  race at the Garrison Hall. It beat the old world record by 8min.

It was not easy and Scott suffered from nausea during the event. He also suffered from vomiting and diarrhea during his races. He often had a 30min break during his races when he took a warm bath to ease the pain in his legs. In one  race he suffered from severe cramp in his legs after , but still managed to complete the race.

In 1886, Scott competed in Australia and was declared the Australian national champion. Scott married Isabella Jarvis in 1881 and the couple had five daughters and two sons. He still kept training and at weekends would get up early and walk the 15km to Waititi from their home in North East Valley, Dunedin, and get back in time to cook the family's breakfast. He died of cancer in 1908 at the age of 49.There is a special display on Scott at the New Zealand Sports Hall of Fame at the Dunedin Railway Station.

References

New Zealand Sports Hall of Fame

New Zealand male racewalkers
Athletes from Dunedin
1860 births
1908 deaths
Burials at Dunedin Northern Cemetery